Hepatoma-derived growth factor, related protein 3, also known as HDGFRP3, is a human gene.

References

Further reading